Beta-tectorin is a protein that in humans is encoded by the TECTB gene.

Function 

The genes for alpha-tectorin and beta-tectorin (this protein) encode the major noncollagenous proteins of the tectorial membrane of the cochlea.

References

Further reading

Extracellular matrix proteins